The Living Christ Series is a 12-part drama television series about the life of Jesus Christ. It was released in 1951 and directed by John T. Coyle.

Plot
A television mini-series told the life of Christ in a version of the typical Hollywood serial film. Each episode was thirty minutes long, bringing the total running time of the series to six hours. Filmed in color in 1951, it is notable for being one of the few American film series of that time in which Christ's face was actually shown. Since the early days of sound, American film producers had been afraid that some members of the audience would be alienated if an actor who did not fit the public's image of Christ was chosen to play the role, so virtually all had played it safe by showing Him only from the back or in long shot. Sometimes only Christ's hand would be seen. Foreign film makers, however, had no such doubts, and Christ was actually shown in such films as the French Golgotha (1935), the Mexican El Martir del Calvario (1952), and the 1953 British serial Jesus of Nazareth.

However, The Living Christ Series was not meant to be shown in movie theatres, but more as an instructional, inspirational film in churches or on Sunday-morning television. Far from being a religious epic, the series was clearly shot mostly on soundstages and on a low budget, much like a typical television program of the era shot on film. Directed by John T. Coyle, the series featured mostly unknown actors or actors who appeared mostly in B-films. A notable exception was Lowell Gilmore, who played Pontius Pilate, and whose most famous previous role was as Basil Hallward in MGM's classic 1945 film The Picture of Dorian Gray. Character actor Lawrence Dobkin also appeared in the series, and Will Wright, perhaps most famous for appearing as Ben Weaver on several episodes of The Andy Griffith Show, was cast as Herod. Martin Balsam also plays a small role. Screen unknown Robert Wilson, who would go on to practically make a career out of playing the role, portrayed Christ. Noted movie trailer announcer Art Gilmore served as narrator.

The Living Christ Series, like other similar religiously themed films, was released by Cathedral Films. It has been released on VHS and DVD, both in separate volumes and in a boxed set.

Cast
 Art Gilmore - Narrator
 Robert Wilson - Jesus
 William Henry - Andrew
 Tyler McVey - Simon Peter
 Robert Bice - Matthew
 Lawrence Dobkin - Caiaphas
 Michael Whalen - Simon the Zealot
 Lowell Gilmore - Pontius Pilate
 Eileen Rowe - Mary the mother

References

External links
 

1951 films
1951 drama films
Portrayals of Jesus in film
Cultural depictions of Pontius Pilate
Cultural depictions of Saint Peter
1950s English-language films